Littleham railway station was a railway station that served Littleham, Exmouth, in Devon, England.

History

The station had two platforms either side of a passing loop, there was a signal box and a goods yard to the south of the station. The goods yard was capable of handling most goods including live stock and was equipped with a 2 ton crane.

The station was host to a Southern Railway camping coach from 1937 to 1939. Three camping coaches were positioned here by the Southern Region from 1954 to 1960, four in 1961 the coaches were replaced in 1962 by four Pullman camping coaches reducing to two Pullmans for 1963 and 1964.

The station was closed when the line closed on 6 March 1967.

Present state
The Station Master's house remains as a private dwelling, the rest having been built over by road and housing.

References

Bibliography
 
 
 
 
 
 

Disused railway stations in Devon
Railway stations in Great Britain opened in 1903
Railway stations in Great Britain closed in 1967
Former London and South Western Railway stations
Beeching closures in England